Smt. Pushpa Srivatsan  is an ardent worshipper of Sadguru Sri Tyagabrahmam (4 May 1767 – 6 January 1847) of Tiruvaiyaru, Tamil Nadu. She is a Sarasvati Veena  artiste. Pushpa picked up the rudiments of the Veena Dhanammal technique from Sri R. Rangaramanuja Ayyangar, a great admirer of Veena Dhanammal and her disciple for 12 years.  Reclusive by nature, Pushpa does not give public performances. For her music is worship. Her veena music and singing are entirely for her Sadguru. She has written prolifically on the Sadguru in chaste Sanskrit. She has also projected onto the Sadguru her ecstatic experiences in the Himalayas, the Ganga and the majestic sea – again in Sanskrit prose and poetry.  All her writings contain her own English and Tamil translations.

Music
The specialities of Pushpa's veena music are singing along with the veena, voice totally blending with the instrument; and not using plectrum (no contact mike either). The subtle overtones of her veena are sweetly audible when she plays without the metallic jangle of plectrums. She plays all the charanams (sub-sections of a song) for each kriti (song). Some of her home recordings are available in archive.org.

Writings

Pushpa's writings are spontaneous expressions of inner experience. She has written Namavalis (series of names and adjectives of the Lord), Gadyams (lilting poetic prose in Sanskrit) and Stotras (adulations unto the Lord) in different meters on the Sadguru. She has also written more than 1200 slokas (verses in a particular meter in Sanskrit poetry) on Mother Ganga (unrivalled), several stotras on different deities, and the story of Sri Rama in her own words (again in sloka form).

A special feature of her writing is different shades of meaning and nuances that enable realistic visualization of the descriptions. For example, in the chapter Sri Ganga Raga Pushpavali (in Sri Gangasahasram),  adjectives for Ganga also happen to form the names of ragas of the Carnatic gamut. So Ganga is additionally described as the embodiment of raga (melody/beauty) and identified with the swarupa (nature and form) of the raga.

Her books have won wide acclaim from eminent Sanskrit scholars. Sri Swami Dayananda Saraswati and Sri Seva Srinivasaraghavachariar (Sewa Swami; himself a composer in Sanskrit and President Awardee) were the first to read her work in manuscript form, appreciate and insist on publishing.(A recluse, Pushpa did not want publicity to her own innermost sacred thoughts). Swami Dayananda's guru, Sri Swami Tarananda Giri of Haridwar, would spend any length of time listening to her poetry. The appreciation from this legend was more than any award for Pushpa. On his attaining samadhi in Haridwar (2004), she instantaneously composed eight verses on him (p.3 of Sri Dayananda Stotravali). Swami Dayananda read out these verses during the final rites as well as at the Rishikesh Ashram.

Personal life

Pushpavalli (named after the Goddess of Tirukkovilur in Tamil Nadu) was born to Smt. Lakshmi and Sri Pattangi Venkatavaradan at Tiruvahindrapuram, Cuddalore. She is married to Sri N.V.Vathsan, IPS. Her two daughters, Radhika Vathsan and Gayatri Vathsan, are trained by her, from early childhood, in vocal music and the Sarasvati veena.

History

A postgraduate in mathematics from Presidency College, Madras, with 1st class distinction, Pushpa was a lecturer in mathematics in Sri Sarada College, Salem for a few years. She gave up her career to pursue music full-time.

Pushpa learnt the fundamental technique of the Veena Dhanammal bani (style) and quite a few kritis from Shri Rangaramanuja Ayyangar. Sri Ayyangar had studied Dhanammal's music deeply and imbibed the subtle nuances of her veena technique, which he immortalised by his notations in his book Kritimanimalai of 4 volumes. Pushpa learnt many more kritis by herself from Kritimanimalai, in which he has given detailed notation with special emphasis on gamakas (musical embellishments). She played them before him and won his hearty appreciation. It is commonly said that while western classical music can be played by the artiste reading from a music sheet, the same is not possible for Carnatic music due to its unique gamakas. This may be true to a certain extent; but every rule has an exception. Today Pushpa has home recordings of about 150 hours of veena music. She has dedicated the 700-odd kritis that she has recorded to the memory of Shri Rangaramanuja Ayyangar.

Books authored by Smt. Pushpa Srivatsan
 Sri Tyagabrahmapushpanjali
 Sri Gangasahasram
 Himalaya Gadyam
 Sri Tyagarama Pushpavali
 Sadguru SriTyagabrahma Pushpanjali Enlarged with Tamil Translitertations
 Sri Dayananda Stotravali - A booklet of stotras on Swami Sri Dayananda Saraswati, founder of ArshaVidyaGurukulam; published in Arsha Vidya Gurukulam newsletters. These were read by Swami Dayananda himself, enjoyed, and commended. His comments are included in the booklet.
 StotraPushpavali - Stotras in different meters on various deities that occurred to her during Puja

Books by the author yet to be published

 Sadguru Sri Tyagabrahma Saptasati - This is in the form of 7 Ashtottarasatams for worship. In the first Ashtottarasatam, each nama begins with ‘Sa". In the second, with "Ri". Similarly, the rest with "Ga, Ma. Pa, Dha" and "Ni". Thus the Saptasati is a Saptaswaravali.
 Sadguru Sri Tyagabrahma Sahasrakam - This contains about 500 Slokas describing the Sadguru in more than 1000 names. This is a new composition, not to be confused with the earlier Sahasranamavali in Pushpanjali. This talks about the Sadguru's parentage, life, music, teachings and philosophy.
 Sadguru Kiirtanavali - This contains about 1000 Slokas, each one depicting a Kirtana of the Sadguru.
 Sadguru Gadyatrayam - This contains 3 Gadyams on Sadguru - Panchanada Gadyam, Sangiita Gadyam and Sri Rama Gadyam.
 ENNappookkaL - About 300 poems in Tamil on the Sadguru with 7 introductory verses on the Lord of Seven Hills(Tirupati Venkatachalapathy).

Reviews
 BookReview_1994_CMNA
 Unique work on Thyagaraja
 Ardent Devotee of Thyagaraja
 Deifying the Himalayas

References

External links
 Veena Renditions and Compositions of Smt. Pushpa Srivathsan
 Sri Panchanadagadyam by Smt. Pushpa Srivatsan, audio rendition
 Sri Tyagarama Gadyam by Smt. Pushpa Srivatsan, audio rendition
 Sanskrit books by Smt. Pushpa Srivatsan

Saraswati veena players
Carnatic instrumentalists
String musicians
Living people
1944 births